Nazario Sauro was the lead ship of her class of four destroyers built for the  (Royal Italian Navy) in the 1920s. Completed in 1926, she served in World War II.

Design and description
The Sauro-class destroyers were enlarged and improved versions of the preceding  . Their complement was 8–10 officers and 146 enlisted men.

The Sauros were powered by two Parsons geared steam turbines, each driving one propeller shaft using steam supplied by three Yarrow boilers.

Their main battery consisted of four  guns in two twin-gun turrets, one each fore and aft of the superstructure. Anti-aircraft (AA) defense for the Sauro-class ships was provided by a pair of  AA guns in single mounts amidships and a pair of  machine guns. They were equipped with six  torpedo tubes in two triple mounts amidships. The Sauros could also carry 52 mines.

Construction and career
Nazario Sauro was laid down by Odero-Terni-Orlando at their Genoa-Sestri Ponente shipyard on 9 February 1924, launched on 12 May 1926 and commissioned on 23 September 1926.

Citations

Bibliography

External links
  Nazario Sauro (1926) Marina Militare website

Sauro-class destroyers
World War II destroyers of Italy
1926 ships
Ships built by Cantieri navali Odero
Maritime incidents in April 1941
World War II shipwrecks in the Mediterranean Sea
Ships sunk by British aircraft
Destroyers sunk by aircraft